Bledsoe is an unincorporated community in Harlan County, Kentucky, United States. The Bledsoe post office  was in service from 1900 to 1918.

References

Unincorporated communities in Harlan County, Kentucky
Unincorporated communities in Kentucky